Robert Kasule Sebunya is a Ugandan politician who was born on 25 January 1970 to Israel Kibirige Ssebunya. He is a member of the National Reisistance Movement (NRM), the ruling party, and the current Member of Parliament of Nansana Municipality, Wakiso District.

Education background
Robert attended Busoga College Mwiri in the period 1989 to 1991 where attained his Uganda Advanced Certificate of Education (UACE). He has a higher diploma in business studies from Nkokonjeru Institute of Management and Technology obtained in 1994. He also graduated with a Bachelor of Business Administration (accounting) from Makerere University in 1998. Robert is currently pushing a master's degree in business administration from East and Southern Africa Management Institute (ESAMI).

Robert Kibirige Sebunya has also benefited from professional trainings offered through the annual seminars on Public Finance Architecture organised by The International Consortium on Government Financial Management and from seminars organised by Parliamentary Network on World Bank and the International Monetary Fund (IMF) as well seminars from the tax compliance and the operations of Uganda Revenue Authority (URA).

Career
Robert is a professional member of the International Consortium on Government Financial Management and is also a member of the Parliamentary Network on the World Bank and the International Monetary Fund (IMF). in 2015 he was recognised by PROFIRA (IFAD) for his outstanding contribution towards the development of the microfinance sector in Uganda.

  2000–2008: Senior accounts officer, National Water and Sewage Corporation (NWSC).
  2008–2011: Member of Parliament, Kyadondo County North
  2011–2016: Member of Parliament, Kyadondo County North
  2016–Date: Member of Parliament, Nansana Municipality, Wakiso District

Parliamentary committee responsibilities
 2011–2016: Chairperson, Committee on Finance, Planning and Economic Development.
 2017–Date: Chairperson, Committee on Tourism, Trade and Industry.

Committee membership
 Member, Parliamentary Committee on National Economy.
 Member, Parliamentary Committee on Commissions, Statuary Authorities and State Enterprises.
 Member, Parliamentary Committee on Legal and Parliamentary Affairs.
 Member of the Public Accounts Committee (Central Government).

References

1970 births
Living people
National Resistance Movement politicians
People from Wakiso District
Members of the Parliament of Uganda